Rajadhyaksha is a surname under the saraswat brahmin caste. Notable people with the surname include:
 Ashish Rajadhyaksha (born 1957), Indian film scholar
 Gautam Rajadhyaksha (1950–2011), Indian fashion photographer
 M.V. Rajadhyaksha (1913–2010), Indian writer and critic
 Vijaya Rajadhyaksha (born 1933), Indian writer, wife of M.V.

Indian surnames